The 1959 Football Cup of Ukrainian SSR among KFK  was the annual season of Ukraine's football knockout competition for amateur football teams.

Competition schedule

First qualification round

|}
Replays

|}
Notes:

Second qualification round

|}
Notes:

Quarterfinals (1/4)
August 19

|}
August 20

|}

Semifinals (1/2)
September 2

|}

Final
September 9

|}

See also
 1959 Football Championship of the Ukrainian SSR

External links
 (1959 - 21 чемпионат СССР Кубок Украинской ССР среди КФК) at footbook.ru
 1959 год. regional-football.ru

Ukrainian Amateur Cup
Ukrainian Amateur Cup
Amateur Cup